Narva Postiljon is a weekly newspaper published in Narva, Estonia since 24. January 2004.  It is published once a week, on Saturdays.

References

Newspapers published in Estonia
Mass media in Narva